The Oder Valley Railway was a railway line from Scharzfeld via Bad Lauterberg to St. Andreasberg-Silberhütte. It follows the upper course of the river Oder in the West Harz mountains, and was commonly named after it.

Geography
The line originated at Scharzfeld station, which has not been served by passenger trains since 2005. This station is situated on the standard gauge South Harz Railway, the main line from Northeim to Nordhausen. From Scharzfeld the line made its way to Bad Lauterberg station, then to the more central halt of Bad Lauterberg-Kurpark, followed by Odertal, Sperrluttertal and St. Andreasberg (Silberhütte/West), from where the St. Andreasberg rack railway continued to St. Andreasberg Stadt. Between Bad Lauterberg and Bad Lauterberg Kurpark, a narrow-gauge industrial railway built for the transport of baryte crossed the line.

History 
The line was opened in 1884. In order to provide a better link from the terminus at St. Andreasberg West to the centre of the town, from 1913 to 1959 a rack railway, the St. Andreasberg rack railway, was operated as a Kleinbahn between St. Andreasberg West to St. Andreasberg Stadt (town). It owned two cogwheel steam locomotives and two mountain railway passenger coaches, and picked up goods wagons at Silberhütte destined for the town station. A project by Prussian chief mechanical engineer, Georg Fichtner, from Berlin, to extend the railway line to Bad Harzburg was not realised.

A halt at Bad Lauterberg Kurpark was established in the early 1960s.

Once railbuses became available, they soon took over the passenger services. In 1963 ten pairs of trains ran daily on weekdays, and eight on Sundays. In addition there was a semi-fast service (Eiltriebwagen) from Bad Lauterberg to Göttingen. 
The rolling stock on the line consisted of Uerdingen railbuses and DMUs DB classes 628 and 624.

When many German branch lines were closed down in the 1970s and the following years, the Odertal line gradually lost its passenger services, too. The closure dates for passenger services were as follows:

 28 May 1975: Odertal–Silberhütte
 2 June 1984: Bad Lauterberg–Odertal
 12 December 2004: Scharzfeld–Bad Lauterberg

Goods traffic from Scharzfeld to Bad Lauterberg ended on 31 December 2001.

Passenger services on the remaining section from (Herzberg –)Scharzfeld to Bad Lauterberg were provided in the later years by DB Class 614 DMUs and ceased on 12 December 2004. With the timetable change on 11 December 2005 the station of Bad Lauterberg was replaced by a halt on the South Harz Line with the name Bad Lauterberg im Harz–Barbis. The new station, however, is situated about 4 kilometres west of the town centre. The former station of Bad Lauterberg was located only about 1 km from the centre, while Bad Lauterberg-Kurpark halt, in use until 1984, was right in the centre.

North of Bad Lauterberg the line has been dismantled following the closure of these sections. After December 2004, the southern section was only used irregularly for goods trains and specials. The last owner of the southern section between Scharzfeld–Bad Lauterberg was the private Almetalbahn. On occasion of the construction of a new road bridge for Bundesstraße 243, this last stretch of line was finally lifted in November 2007 using a road-rail excavator, because economic operation of the line was no longer considered possible.

The half-timbered station building of Bad Lauterberg now houses a restaurant. The building at Bad Lauterberg Kurpark was used by a café, but was demolished in 2015. Odertal station building is now the club house of a local fishing club, while St Andreasberg West (formerly Silberhütte) station has been demolished. Hiking is now possible on the former railway trackbed between Silberhütte and Odertal, and the section between Odertal and Bad Lauterberg Kurpark has been converted into a combined foot and cycling path. Between Bad Lauterberg Kurpark and Bad Lauterberg, the line has been mostly overbuilt.

External links

References 

Railway lines in Lower Saxony
Transport in the Harz
Goslar (district)
Osterode (district)
Railway lines opened in 1884